The National Agency for Civil Protection is an Agency within the Ministry of Defence of Albania that is responsible for disaster risk assessment and civil protection The head of the new Agency is Haki Çako.

History 
Under communist rule, Albania’s military was responsible for emergency management, focusing mostly on response rather than mitigation or prevention activities. Since the end of the communist regime, Albania has made significant steps towards developing an emergency management system. In 1999, to coordinate assistance during the Kosovo refugee crisis, an Emergency Management Group (EMG) was established under the Office of the Prime Minister. After the refugee crisis, the Government dissolved the EMG and passed a series of laws and decrees to establish a new emergency management system.

In 2001, the Government of Albania passed Law No. 8756, "Civil Emergency Services," which defined Government-wide emergency management roles and responsibilities. According to that law planning and implementation of civil emergency plans was the responsibility of the General Directorate for Civil Emergencies (GDCE). Since November 2019, following the enactment of the new Law 45/2019 ‘On civil protection”, GDCE is transformed into an Agency, the National Agency for Civil Protection (NACP).

See also 
 Civil defense by nation
 Fire and Rescue services of Albania

References 

Directorate
Emergency services in Albania